The Daughters of the Sacred Heart of Jesus  (Italian: Figlie del Sacro Cuore di Gesù; Latin: Institutum Filiarum Sacratissimi Cordis Jesu; abbreviation: F.S.C.G.) is a religious institute of pontifical right whose members profess public vows of chastity, poverty, and obedience and follow the evangelical way of life in common.

Their mission includes missionary work, pastoral ministry, education of youth, care of the sick.

This religious institute was founded in Bergamo, Italy, in 1831, by Teresa Verzeri and Giuseppe Benaglio.

The sisters have houses in Albania, Argentina, Bolivia, Brazil, Cameroon, Central African Republic, India, Italy and Ivory Coast. The Generalate of the Congregation can be found in Rome, Italy.

On 31 December 2005 there are 595 sisters in 83 communities.

External links
 Daughters of the Sacred Heart of Jesus official site

Catholic female orders and societies
Religious organizations established in 1831
Catholic religious institutes established in the 19th century
1831 establishments in Italy